Parirazona is a genus of moths belonging to the family Tortricidae.

Species
Parirazona bomana Razowski & Becker, 2007
Parirazona brusqueana Razowski & Becker, 1993
Parirazona caracae Razowski & Becker, 2007
Parirazona dolorosa (Meyrick, 1932)
Parirazona illota Razowski & Becker, 1993
Parirazona lagoana Razowski & Becker, 1993
Parirazona penthinana (Razowski, 1967)
Parirazona serena (Clarke, 1968)
Parirazona sobrina Razowski & Becker, 1993

See also
List of Tortricidae genera

References

 , 1984, Acta zool. cracov. 27: 240
 , 2011: Diagnoses and remarks on genera of Tortricidae, 2: Cochylini (Lepidoptera: Tortricidae). Shilap Revista de Lepidopterologia 39 (156): 397–414.
 ,2005 World Catalogue of Insects, 6

External links
tortricidae.com

Cochylini
Tortricidae genera